Merle Allin (born April 9, 1955) is an American bass guitarist. He is the elder brother of the late punk rock vocalist GG Allin.

Allin played electric bass for three groups that featured GG Allin: Malpractice, The AIDS Brigade and the third version of The Murder Junkies. He currently continues the Murder Junkies, his brother's final backing band, with original drummer Donald ("Dino Sex") Sachs, and several younger members.

Allin is featured extensively in the documentary film Hated: GG Allin and the Murder Junkies, by future Road Trip and  The Hangover director Todd Phillips.

Allin was also bass player in late 70s Boston punk group Thrills (a.k.a. City Thrills), who released several singles and were the subject of a later CD discography. He subsequently joined the band Cheater Slicks, and played bass guitar on their debut album On Your Knees.

Allin also appears in the full-length Allin family documentary GG Allin: All in the Family (2018), directed by Sami Saif.

Outside of his work as a musician, Allin is a noted collector of serial killer memorabilia and was featured in two installments of Soft White Underbelly.

References

Living people
American punk rock bass guitarists
American male bass guitarists
The Murder Junkies members
20th-century American bass guitarists
20th-century American male musicians
1953 births